Haji Mwita Haji (born October 3, 1949) is a former Member of Parliament in the National Assembly (CCM party) of Tanzania.

References

Living people
Members of the National Assembly (Tanzania)
Place of birth missing (living people)
1949 births